Rhodeus uyekii is a temperate freshwater fish belonging to the Acheilognathinae sub-family of the family Cyprinidae.  It originates in inland rivers in South Korea. It was originally described as Pseudoperilampus uyekii by T. Mori in 1935.  

Named in honor of Homiki Uyeki (1882-1976), botanist, Suigen Agricultural College (type locality is in Suigen, Korea).

The fish reaches a length up to 6.0 cm (2.4 in). When spawning, the females deposit their eggs inside bivalves, where they hatch and the young remain until they can swim.

References 

uyekii
Fish described in 1935
Taxa named by Tamezo Mori